Bessie Kate Johnson (18 November 1878 – 4 May 1957) was an English actress who appeared on stage from 1894 and on screen from the 1930s to the 1950s.<ref name=BFISCREENONLINE>http://www.screenonline.org.uk/people/id/557746/index.html</>Johnson on the British Film Institute website</ref>

Biography 
In 1908 she married the actor Frank Goodenough Bayly (1873 – 28 November 1923, Newcastle upon Tyne). The couple had two children, William Frank Goodenough Bayly (1910-1973) and Johnson Goodenough Bayly (1915-1980).

She first appeared in a film at age 53, in 1932, but never received critical acclaim for her performances until 1955, when she starred, aged 76, in the Ealing Studios comedy The Ladykillers as Mrs Louisa Wilberforce. The role earned her a British Film Academy award for best British actress. She died less than two years afterwards having only appeared in a single further film.

She also appeared in the BBC science fiction serial The Quatermass Experiment (1953) and played a spy in I See a Dark Stranger (1946).

Selected filmography 

 After Office Hours (1932) – Miss Wilesden
 A Glimpse of Paradise (1934) – Mrs. Fielding
 Laburnum Grove (1936) – Mrs. Radfern
 Dusty Ermine (1936) – Emily Kent
 Farewell Again (1937) – Mother of soldier in hospital (uncredited)
 The Last Adventurers (1937) – (uncredited)
 Sunset in Vienna (1937) – Woman in Café (uncredited)
 The Dark Stairway (1938) – (uncredited)
 Marigold (1938) – Santa Dunlop
 Gaslight (1940) – Alice Barlow's Maid (uncredited)
 Two for Danger (1940) – (uncredited)
 Freedom Radio (1941) – Granny Schmidt
 Jeannie (1941) – Mathilda
 The Black Sheep of Whitehall (1942) – Train Passenger (uncredited)
 Talk About Jacqueline (1942) – Ethel
 Tawny Pipit (1944) – Miss Pyman
 He Snoops to Conquer (1944) – Ma – George's Landlady (uncredited)
 Love Letters (1945) – Nurse (uncredited)
 The Years Between (1946) – Old Man's Wife
 I See a Dark Stranger (1946) – Old Lady on Train
 Meet Me at Dawn (1947) – Henriette – Mme. Vermomel's Housekeeper
 Code of Scotland Yard (1947) – Music Box Seller. (uncredited)
 Death of an Angel (1952) – Sarah Oddy
 I Believe in You (1952) – Miss Mackiln
 Lady in the Fog (1952) – 'Mary Stuart' – Old Inmate at Murder Scene
 The Large Rope (1953) – Grandmother
 Three Steps in the Dark (1953) – Mrs. Riddle
 The Rainbow Jacket (1954) – (uncredited)
 The Delavine Affair (1954) – Mrs. Bissett
 Out of the Clouds (1955) – Passenger (uncredited)
 John and Julie (1955) – Old Lady
 The Ladykillers (1955) – Mrs. Wilberforce (The Old Lady)
 How to Murder a Rich Uncle (1957) – Alice (final film role) – (released posthumously, in June 1957)

Additional sources 
Film academy awards, The Times, February 13, 1956, pg. 5
Obituary, The Times, May 9, 1957, pg. 12
Will, The Times, July 29, 1957, pg. 10

References

External links 

 Performances listed in Theatre Archive University of Bristol

1878 births
1957 deaths
19th-century English actresses
20th-century English actresses
Actresses from Kent
Actresses from Sussex
Best British Actress BAFTA Award winners
English film actresses
English stage actresses
English television actresses
People from Clayton, West Sussex
People from Elham, Kent